Gladys Jacqueline Good "Hap" Miller (December 9, 1926 – September 1993) was an American architect active in Terre Haute, Indiana, from 1950 to 1979, primarily specializing in residential architecture.

Biography

Gladys Jacqueline Good was born on December 9, 1926, in Riverton, New Jersey, to Paul and Ella Mabel Good. She married Ewing Harry Miller II, whose father's family was from Terre Haute, on December 18, 1948, in a ceremony at Calvary Presbyterian Church. The two met while attending the University of Pennsylvania. Miller and her husband moved to Philadelphia, Pennsylvania, where she worked as a draftsman until 1951. The two moved to Terre Haute in 1951, where they continued to live and raise their family.  In 1979, she was diagnosed with Alzheimer's Disease. In 1980, she moved with her family to Indianapolis, eventually passing away from the complications of her illness in Maryland on September 3, 1993. Her remains are interred at Calvary Presbyterian Church. Her family, friends, and colleagues knew her familiarly as “Hap” or “Happy”.

Practice
Miller graduated from the University of Pennsylvania in 1949 with a Bachelor of Architecture degree. In 1948 she received the Beaux Arts Institute of Design Award, now the Van Alen Institute in New York City, which enabled her to travel extensively throughout Europe before beginning her career. Upon her return, Miller worked as a draftsman in the offices of Alfred Bendiner (1948–50) and Bolton, Martin & White (1950) in Philadelphia. In 1951 she moved to Terre Haute, where she became the third registered woman architect in Indiana. She began her career in Indiana working as a draftsman for Miller & Vrydagh from 1951 to 1953, and then as a designer for Miller, Vrydagh & Miller from 1954 to 1957. In 1958 Miller established her own architecture firm, Gladys J. Miller Architect. She worked primarily in residential architecture, in or around Terre Haute, Indiana.

Works
Girl Scouts Headquarters, Terre Haute, IN,1973 
Dobbs Park Nature Center, Terre Haute, IN, 1975
 Dr. and Mrs. D. W. Conor, Jr. House, Terre Haute, IN, 1974
Jerry Clegg House, Terre Haute, IN, 1958 
Indiana State University President’s House Remodel, Terre Haute, IN, 1965 
Margaret Jane Adamson House, 1035 Gilchrist Road, Terre Haute, IN, 1961 
Unitarian Universalist Society Meeting House Remodel, Terre Haute, IN, 1967 
United Daycare Center Addition and Remodel, 2051 Beech Street, Terre Haute, IN, 1976

References

1926 births
1993 deaths
Architects from Indiana
Architects from New Jersey
People from Riverton, New Jersey
People from Terre Haute, Indiana
University of Pennsylvania School of Design alumni